Luule Komissarov (née Luule Proos, from 1964 until 1969 Luule Laanet, until 1974 Luule Paljasmaa; born on 11 August 1942 in Haapsalu) is an Estonian actress.

In 1965 she graduated from Tallinn State Conservatory Stage Art Department. 1965-1992 she played at Estonian Youth Theatre. Since 1996 she has been a contracted actress at the Ugala Theatre. Besides theatre roles she has played also in several films.

She was formerly married to actor and journalist Aivo Paljasmaa and actor and director Kalju Komissarov.

Awards
 1983: Meritorious Artist of the Estonian SSR
 2004: Order of the White Star, IV class.

Selected filmography

 1971: Metskapten
 1993: Õnne 13	
 1994: Tulivesi 
 1995: Wikmani poisid 
 2018: Seltsimees laps 
 2019: Tõde ja õigus	
 2020: Hüvasti, NSVL

References

1942 births
Estonian stage actresses
Estonian film actresses
Estonian television actresses
Estonian radio actresses
20th-century Estonian actresses
21st-century Estonian actresses
Recipients of the Order of the White Star, 4th Class
Estonian Academy of Music and Theatre alumni
People from Haapsalu
Living people